Longueira may refer to:

Places
Achada Longueira, a settlement in Cape Verde
Longueira, Cape Verde, a village in Cape Verde
Longueira / Almograve, a civil parish in Portugal

People
Pablo Longueira, a Chilean politician and industrial civil engineer